William Phillips (May 30, 1878 – February 23, 1968) was a career United States diplomat who served twice as an Under Secretary of State. He was also the United States Ambassador to Canada.

Early life
Phillips was born on May 30, 1878 in Beverly, Massachusetts. His parents were John Charles Phillips, Jr. (1838–1885), who married Anna Tucker in London, England on October 23, 1874. His older brother was John Charles Phillips (1876–1938), a prominent  zoologist, ornithologist and environmentalist.  He had two sisters, Anna Tucker Phillips, who was married to Raynal Bolling (1877–1918) (the first American officer killed in WWI), and Martha Phillips, who was married to Andrew James Peters (1872–1938) (a U.S. Congressman and former Mayor of Boston).

Phillips was a member of the Boston Brahmin Phillips family and his ancestors included John Phillips, the first Mayor of Boston and his great-grandfather, Wendell Phillips, the abolitionist and his grand-uncle, and Samuel Phillips, Jr., and John Phillips, founders of the Phillips Academy and Phillips Exeter Academy. He was a descendant of the Rev. George Phillips of Watertown, the progenitor of the New England Phillips family in America.

He graduated from Harvard College in 1900 and graduated from Harvard Law School in 1903.

Career
His first political job was working as a private secretary in London to Joseph Hodges Choate, the United States Ambassador to the Court of St. James. Choate was a friend of Phillips' family and was also from Massachusetts.

Phillips subsequently went to work for the United States Minister to China in Beijing. After his return from China, he became a member of President Theodore Roosevelt's Tennis Cabinet, and thanks to his previous diplomatic experience and new friendship with Roosevelt, he was assigned to set up the State Department's Division of Far Eastern Affairs and was made its first chief. In 1909, he returned to work in London for Ambassador Whitelaw Reid.

In 1914, Phillips was appointed as Assistant Secretary of State under President Woodrow Wilson and remained in that position until 1920, when he was made the Minister Plenipotentiary to Netherlands and Luxembourg (in residence in the Netherlands).

From 1922 to 1924, he served as Under Secretary of State. In 1924, he was appointed as Ambassador to Belgium, where he remained until 1927, when he became the first Minister to Canada until 1929.

He served as Under Secretary of State again from 1933 to 1936.

In 1936, he was appointed as the Ambassador to Italy, which was then led by Benito Mussolini, in the immediate aftermath of that country's invasion of Ethiopia. He resigned on October 6, 1941. The following year, he was made chief of the United States Office of Strategic Services in London.

In October 1942, Phillips was appointed as a personal representative of President Franklin D. Roosevelt and served in India. (The United States would not have an official mission there until the country's independence in 1947.) Phillips was said to be extremely unpopular with the British for his pro-independence views. In 1943, he was made a Special Advisor on European political matters to General Dwight D. Eisenhower, with the rank of ambassador.

Phillips retired officially in 1944 but returned briefly to diplomatic life in 1945, when he was made a special assistant to Secretary of State Edward R. Stettinius, Jr. In 1946, he served on the Anglo-American Committee on Palestine and opposed the British plan to partition the territory. In 1947, he was unsuccessful in mediating a border dispute between Siam and French Indochina.

In 1953, his memoir, Ventures in Diplomacy, was published by the Beacon Press.

Personal life
In 1910, Phillips married Caroline Astor Drayton (1880–1965), the daughter of Charlotte Augusta Astor (1858–1920), the eldest Sister of Titanic victim John Jacob Astor IV, and J. Coleman Drayton (1852–1934) and a granddaughter of William Backhouse Astor Jr. (1829–1892) and Caroline Webster Schermerhorn (1830–1908). Through her father, she was a great-granddaughter of U.S. Representative William Drayton (1776–1846). Together, they were the parents of:

 Beatrice Schermerhorn Phillips (1914–2003), who married Rear Adm. Elliott Bowman Strauss (1903-2003), in 1951.
 William Phillips, Jr. (1916–1991), who married Barbara Holbrook (1915–1997), in 1941.
 Drayton Phillips (1917–1985), who married Evelyn Gardiner in 1940.
 Christopher Hallowell Phillips (1920–2008), served as United States Ambassador to Brunei from 1989 to 1991.
 Anne Caroline Phillips (1922–2016), who married John Winslow Bryant (1914–1999), in 1942.

Phillips died on February 23, 1968, at the age of 89.

References

External links

 
 

1878 births
1968 deaths
Phillips family (New England)
United States Under Secretaries of State
Harvard College alumni
Harvard Law School alumni
Massachusetts lawyers
People from Beverly, Massachusetts
United States Assistant Secretaries of State
Ambassadors of the United States to Belgium
Ambassadors of the United States to Canada
Ambassadors of the United States to Italy
Ambassadors of the United States to Luxembourg
Ambassadors of the United States to the Netherlands
Woodrow Wilson administration personnel
Harding administration personnel
Coolidge administration personnel
Hoover administration personnel
Franklin D. Roosevelt administration personnel
20th-century American diplomats